Michael Kaufman or Kauffman may refer to:
 Michael Kaufman (author), promoter of the White Ribbon Campaign
 Andy Kaufman's brother
 Michael T. Kaufman (1938–2010), writer for the New York Times
 Michael Kauffmann (born 1931), art historian
 Michael M. Kaufmann (1891–1949), Chicago businessman
 Michael Kaufmann (Silent Hill), a fictional character

See also 
 Michael Kofman, American military analyst